Rok Golčar (born 23 December 1985 in Slovenj Gradec, Yugoslavia) is a professional handball player currently playing for RK Gorenje Velenje.

Information
Height:  
Weight:  
Position: right wing

Career
Clubs: RK Gorenje, Ormož 
Career: 1996

References
 Predstavitev Ekipe In Strokovnega Vodstva 

Living people
Sportspeople from Slovenj Gradec
Slovenian male handball players
1985 births